Paloma Creek is a master-planned community in Northeastern Denton County, Texas, United States. The community is listed by the U.S. Census Bureau as two separate census-designated places, "Paloma Creek" and "Paloma Creek South", separated by U.S. Highway 380. As of the 2010 census, the Paloma Creek CDP (known locally as "Paloma Creek North") had a population of 2,501, while Paloma Creek South had a population of 2,753.  As of 2022, the HOA currently estimates the population to be approximately 20,000.

The complete master-planned community is located north and south of U.S. Route 380 in an unincorporated area governed by the Denton County Fresh Water Supply Districts 8-A, 8-B, 11-A, 11-B, and 11-C.  The Lakeside Estates neighborhood shares Paloma Creek's HOA and is located on the West side of South Paloma Creek. Although it is within the town limits of Little Elm, the vast majority of the 5,600 homes are within the five FWSDs. The homes referred to as North Paloma Creek that are North of 380 have Aubrey mailing addresses. The homes in South Paloma Creek have Little Elm mailing addresses.  

FWSD 11-B is also shared with Northlake Estates; however, those homes are not part of Paloma Creek.  They merely share infrastructure.  Phase I was completed in 2022 with 97 homes and Phase II began shortly thereafter with an additional 252 homes slated for completion.

The proximity to US Route 380 Highway, Dallas North Tollway, and Lewisville Lake Toll Bridge are major factors for the rapid residential growth in the area.

In early 2005, the first phase of homes was completed.  Upon its completion, the community will be populated with 5,600 homes constructed by several different builders.

Paloma Creek is divided into the sections listed below:

Paloma Creek North - 900 home sites, comprising the "Paloma Creek" census-designated place
Paloma Creek South - 4,700 home sites

Education
The Paloma Creek census-designated place is within the Denton Independent School District. The CDP is zoned to Paloma Creek Elementary School, Navo Middle School, and Braswell High School.

Previously, all of the CDP was zoned to Paloma Creek Elementary, and Navo Middle School, while it was split between the boundaries of Billy Ryan High School and Denton High School.

Some areas of the development are in Little Elm Independent School District
 Lakeview Elementary School
 Oak Point Elementary School
 Walker Middle School 
 Little Elm High School

The majority of Denton County, Paloma Creek included, is in the boundary of North Central Texas College.

There is also an active Homeschool Community. The southern area of the community is located within the bounds of the Little Elm Independent School District. The zoning maps for Little Elm ISD and Denton ISD are available here.

Builders

Current Builder
 Bloomfield Homes

Former Builders
 American Legend Homes
 Ashton Woods Homes
 Beazer Homes
 Centex Homes
 D. R. Horton
 David Weekley Homes
 Drees Custom Homes
 Dunhill Homes
 Fox & Jacobs Homes
 Gehan Homes
 Highland Homes
 Holiday Builders
 Horizon Homes
 Kimball Hill Homes
 Onyx Homes
 Plantation Homes
 Sandlin Custom Homes
 Trendmaker Homes
 William Ryan Homes

Retail
Paloma Creek Shopping Center is located within the town limits of Little Elm at U.S. Route 380 and Paloma Creek Boulevard, between the two units of the Paloma Creek development.  Major tenants on the North side of the highway include Walgreens, Kwik Kar Lube & Auto Center, Pizza Hut, Sonic Drive-In, Wendy's and Sherwin-Williams. The South side of the highway is home to 7-Eleven with a Shell gas station, O'Reilly Auto Parts, Circle K, and Public Storage.

Protection and Services
Police protection is provided by the Little Elm Police Department.  Fire protection is provided by the City of Aubrey Fire Department funded by a monthly fee, added to the water bill, to cover residents of Paloma Creek. The town of Little Elm is required to serve the commercial areas, as they are located in its town limits. Water and sewer is provided by a fresh water supply district who contracts with Mustang SUD for billing purposes and Rhino Removal for trash and recycling. All of Paloma Creek uses CoServ as its electric and gas utility provider.

References

External links
Paloma Creek Fresh Water Supply Districts
Paloma Creek Homeowners Association
Paloma Creek Neighborhood Crime Watch

Dallas–Fort Worth metroplex
Census-designated places in Denton County, Texas
Census-designated places in Texas
Populated places established in 2005
2005 establishments in Texas